Clube Desportivo Primeiro de Agosto is an Angolan multisports club based in Luanda. The club is attached to the Angolan Armed Forces which is its main sponsor. The club's men's and women's handball teams compete at the local level, at the Luanda Provincial Handball Championship and at the Angolan Men's and Women's leagues as well as at continental level, at the annual African Handball Champions League competitions.

Primeiro de Agosto Men's Handball

Honours: Men's Handball

National Championship :
Winner (26): 1980, 1981, 1982, 1983, 1984, 1986, 1987, 1991, 1992, 1993, 1994, 1995, 1996, 1998, 2000, 2002, 2003, 2004, 2005, 2007, 2008, 2011, 2012, 2013, 2015, 2016
 Runner Up (6) : 2001, 2002, 2006, 2009, 2010, 2014

Angola Cup :
Winner (4): 2007, 2008, 2013, 2015
 Runner Up (5) : 2006, 2010, 2011, 2012, 2016

Angola Super Cup :
Winner (4): 2008, 2009, 2012, 2016
 Runner Up (2) : 2013, 2014

CHAB Club Champions Cup :
Winner (1): 2007
 Runner Up (0) :

CHAB Babacar Fall Super Cup:
Winner (1): 2003
 Runner Up (0) :

 Double
 Winners (4): 2006–07, 2007–08, 2012–13, 2014–15
 Triple Crown 
 Winners (1): 2006–07

Squad (Men)

Players

2011-2017

Former notable players

Manager history

Primeiro de Agosto Women's Handball
Primeiro de Agosto Women's Handball team is the only African club in all sports to become a World Club Champion. They accomplished this feat by winning the first edition of the IHF Women's Super Globe in 2019.

Honours: Women's Handball
Angola Women's League :
Winner: 2011, 2013, 2014, 2015, 2016, 2017
 Runner Up: 2004, 2006, 2009, 2010, 2012

Angola Cup:
Winner: 2015
 Runner Up: 2010, 2011, 2012, 2013, 2014, 2016, 2017
Angola Super Cup:
Winner: 2016
 Runner Up: 2011, 2012, 2013, 2014, 2015, 2017, 2018
African Champions League :
Winner: 2014, 2015, 2016, 2017, 2018
 Runner Up: 2009, 2011, 2012, 2013
African Cup Winner's Cup :
Winner: 2015, 2016, 2017, 2019
 Runner Up: 2018
African Super Cup:
Winner: 2015, 2016, 2017, 2018, 2019
IHF Women's Super Globe:
Winner: 2019

Squad (Women)

Players

 = African champions cup winner

Manager history

See also
Primeiro de Agosto Football
Primeiro de Agosto Basketball
Primeiro de Agosto Volleyball
Primeiro de Agosto Roller Hockey
Federação Angolana de Andebol

References

External links
  
 1agostoandebol.blogspot 

C.D. Primeiro de Agosto
Angolan handball clubs
Handball clubs established in 1979
1979 establishments in Angola
Sports clubs in Luanda